Spice Valley Township is one of nine townships in Lawrence County, Indiana, United States. As of the 2010 census, its population was 2,423 and it contained 1,137 housing units.

History
The Williams Bridge was listed in the National Register of Historic Places in 1981.

Geography

Unincorporated towns
 Bryantsville at 
 Georgia at 
 Huron at 
 Moorestown at 
 Williams at 
(This list is based on USGS data and may include former settlements.)

Cemeteries
The township contains these nine cemeteries: Brunner, Bryantsville, Burton, Connerley Switch, Cox, Georgia, Grodey, Huron and Tincher.

Major highways
  U.S. Route 50
  State Road 60

Lakes
 Half Moon Lake

Education
 Mitchell Community Schools
 North Lawrence Community Schools

Spice Valley Township residents may obtain a free library card from the Mitchell Community Public Library in Mitchell.

Political districts
 Indiana's 4th congressional district
 State House District 62
 State Senate District 44

References
 
 United States Census Bureau 2008 TIGER/Line Shapefiles
 IndianaMap

External links
 Indiana Township Association
 United Township Association of Indiana
 City-Data.com page for Spice Valley Township

Townships in Lawrence County, Indiana
Townships in Indiana